Lignières-Châtelain is a commune in the Somme department in Hauts-de-France in northern France.

Geography

Population

Places of interest
 Church of Saint-Barthélémy

See also
Communes of the Somme department

References

External links

 Statistical data, INSEE

Communes of Somme (department)